The Microregion of Araçatuba is located on the northwest of São Paulo state, Brazil, and is made up of 7 municipalities. It belongs to the Mesoregion of Araçatuba.

The population of the Microregion is 256,560 inhabitants, in an area of 5,365.6 km²

Municipalities 
The microregion consists of the following municipalities, listed below with their 2010 Census populations (IBGE/2010):

Araçatuba: 181,579
Bento de Abreu: 2,674
Guararapes: 30,597
Lavínia: 8,779
Rubiácea: 2,729
Santo Antônio do Aracanguá: 7,626
Valparaíso: 22,576

References

Aracatuba